Isikeli Ratucava (born 6 November 1998) is a Fijian footballer who plays as a left back for Fijian club Nasinu and the Fiji national team.

Club career
Ratucava came through the youth ranks of Suva. In 2016 he made his debut for the first team in a game against Labasa at Subrail Park. However after his debut, he didn't manage to get into the starting eleven for Suva. After stints with second division clubs Lami and Rakiraki he signed in October 2018 for Fiji Premier League side Nasinu.

National team
In 2019 Ratucava was called up by coach Christophe Gamel for the Fiji national football team. He made his debut on June 7, 2019, in a 1–1 draw against Tahiti. He came in for Kavaia Rawaqa in the 46th minute of play. After his debut Ratucava was included in Gamel's squad for the 2019 Pacific Games were Ratucava and his team mates managed to win a bronze medal.

References

External links
 

Living people
1998 births
Fijian footballers
Fiji international footballers
Association football defenders